Francisco Pedro de Conceição Rocha (born 9 April 1927) is a former Portuguese footballer who played as a defender.

External links 
 

1927 births
Portuguese footballers
Association football forwards
Primeira Liga players
C.F. Os Belenenses players
Portugal international footballers
Possibly living people